The following lists events that happened during 1999 in Colombia.

Incumbents
President: Andrés Pastrana Arango
Vice President: Gustavo Adolfo Bell Lemus

Events

January
 January 25 - The 6.2  Armenia, Colombia earthquake kills at least 1,900.

Births
 9 March – Carlos Cuesta, football defender
 22 April – Cucho Hernández, football forward
 17 June – Luis Sinisterra, football left winger
 25 September – Camilo Monroy, football forward
 27 September – Anderson Arroyo, football defender
 26 October - Luis Patiño, baseball pitcher

References

 
1990s in Colombia
Years of the 20th century in Colombia
Colombia
Colombia